Below is a list of villages depopulated or destroyed during the Arab–Israeli conflict.

1880–1946

Arab villages
A number of these villages, those in the Jezreel Valley, were inhabited by tenants of land which was sold by a variety of owners, some local and others absentee landlord families, such as the Karkabi, Tueini, Farah and Khuri families and Sursock family of Lebanon. In some cases land was sold directly by local fellahim (peasant owners). The sale of land to Jewish organizations meant that tenant farmers were displaced.

List of Palestinian villages from which tenant farmers were uprooted before 1948, with the cause of the uprooting (i.e., sale by landlord or some other cause) given along with the name of Jewish settlements on newly acquired land (in parentheses) can be seen below.

Safed district
 al-Mutila, 1896 (Metula) Land, 12,800 dunams, sold under Ottoman law by landlord, a Christian from Sidon named Jabur Bey, to Baron de Rothschild's chief officer Joshua Ossovetski. Druze villagers displaced.
 Difna, 1939 (Dafna)
 al-Manara, unknown date (Manara) 2538 dunams of land purchased by the Jewish National Fund from the landlord, Asa'ad Bey Khuri of Beirut.
 Najmat as-Subah, unknown date (Ayelet HaShahar)

Acre district
 Ja'atoun, unknown date (Ga'aton)
 Khirbat Jiddin, 1946, other sources says 1948 (Yehiam)

Tiberias district
 Um al-Junah, unknown date (Degania Bet)
 Malhamiyah, 1902 According to Edward Said, the Jewish farming village of Menahemia) was established in 1902 on land purchased by the Jewish Colonization Association in 1901; 3,000 dunams were purchased directly from local fellahim, 700 dunhams from local landlords, and over 60,000 dunams from landlords in Beirut; the Sursuq, Tuenis, and Mudawwar families. The Arab tenant farmers were evicted by Ottoman authorities.
 Sha’arah, beginning of the 20th century (Omer Sha’ara, today Shadmot Dvora)
 Sarona, 1910 (Sharona)
 Sarjuna, unknown date (Shorshim, today HaZor'im)
 Yammah, 1901 (Yavniel)

Nazareth district
 Jabata, 1926 (Gvat)
 Khunaifis, 1926 (Sarid)
 Ganigar, Jinjar, Jenjar, Junjar, 1922, Ginegar,
 Rab an-Nasrah, unknown date (Mazra)
 Tal al-’Adas, unknown date (Tel Adashim)
 al-'Afoulah, 1925 (Afula)
 al-Foulah, 1910 (Merhavia)
 Mashah, 1902 (Kfar Tavor)
 Samouniyah, unknown date (Shimron nature reserve, Timrat)
 Umm Kubei, unknown date
Beisan district
 Khirbat Bayt Ilfa, unknown date (Beit Alpha)
 Shatah, unknown date (Beit HaShita)
 Tall al-Fir, 1922 (none)
 Jaloud, 1922 (Ein Harod)
 Zarra'a, Jewish National Fund bought the land in the 1930s, Tirat Tzvi established on the site in 1938
 Jisr Majami
Haifa district
 Jadroun, 1925 (Kfar Bialik)
 Kurdani, unknown date (Afek)
 Kafr Ata, 1925 (Kfar Ata – today Kiryat Ata)
 al-Majdal, 1925 (none)
 al-Harbaj, 1924 (Kfar Hasidim)
 al-Harithiyah, 1924 (Sha'ar HaAmakim)
 Tab’oun, unknown date (Tivon, today Kiryat Tivon)
 Qusqous, unknown date (Alonim)
 Jida, 1925 (Ramat Yishai)
 Tal ash-Shamam, 1925 (Kfar Yehoshua)
 Qamoun, 1925 (Yokneam)
 Ja’ara, unknown date (Ein HaShofet)
 Um ad-Dafouf, unknown date (Dalia) 
 Um at-Tout, unknown date (none)
 Shifiyah, unknown date (Meir Shfeya)
 Zamarin, 1882 (Zikhron Ya'akov)
 Um al-’Alaq, unknown date, (Ramat HaNadiv)
 ash-Shounah, unknown date (none), maybe identical to Khirbat al-Shuna destroyed in 1948
 Zarghaniyah, unknown date (Binyamina)
 al-Buraij, unknown date (Binyamina)
 Natalah, unknown date (No data)
 Nazlah, unknown date (none)
 Safsaf, unknown date (none)
 Hadidun, unknown date (none)
 Karkour, unknown date (Ein Shemer, Gan HaShomron, Karkur, Tel Shalom)
 Bidous, unknown date (Maanit)
 Shaikh Hilw, unknown date (Nahliel, now part from Hadera)
 Zardarah, unknown date (Gan Shmuel)
 Baika, unknown date (Hadera)
 al-Marah, 1903 (Givat Ada)
 ’Aabiyah, 1929 (Pardes Hanna)
 Sheikh Bureik Sold during the early 1920s, by the Sursuk family to the Jewish National Fund. The Arab tenants were evicted and in 1925 an agricultural settlement also named Sheikh Abreik was established there by the Hapoel HaMizrachi, a Zionist political party.

Tulkarm district
 Shaikh Muhammad, unknown date (Elyashiv)

Jerusalem district
 Beit Jimal

Ramla district
 Kafr Wariyah, unknown date (Kfar Uria)
 Jindas (Ginaton)

Jewish villages

1929 Palestine riots
During the 1929 Palestine riots:

 Bat Yam
 Be'er Tuvia
 Giv'on HaHadashah
 Hartuv

 Kfar Uria
 Kiryat Ata
 Motza
 Ramat Rachel
 Hebron

1936–1939 Arab revolt in Palestine
During the 1936–1939 Arab revolt in Palestine:

 Kfar Shiloah
 Silwan Jewish population removed by the Kehillah Welfare Bureau and later the British authorities during the 1936–1939 Arab revolt in Palestine
 Kfar Etzion
 Hebron

1948 Arab–Israeli War

Arab villages

Palestinian Arab residents were expelled from hundreds of towns and villages by the Israel Defense Forces, or fled in fear as the Israeli army advanced. Around 400 Arab towns and villages were depopulated.

Jewish villages
The main Jewish areas depopulated in 1948 were the Jewish Quarter of the Old City of Jerusalem and the Gush Etzion. Approximately 30-40km2 of land was owned by Jews in the areas which became the West Bank and Gaza Strip (approximately 6,000km2); some of this land was uninhabited.

In areas that became the West Bank
 North Jerusalem bloc (Atarot and Neve Yaakov)
 Dead Sea block (Kalia and Beit HaArava)
 Jewish Quarter (Jerusalem)
 Gush Etzion bloc near Jerusalem (Ein Tzurim, Kfar Etzion, Masuot Yitzhak, Revadim)

In areas that became Gaza Strip (All-Palestine protectorate)
 Kfar Darom (resettled but evacuated as part of the Israeli disengagement from Gaza in 2005)

Israel-Syria border
 Hauran 

In Transjordan
 Tel Or

Many of these areas were repopulated after the Six-Day War.

Six-Day War

West Bank
Three Arab villages, Bayt Nuba, Imwas and Yalo, located in the Latrun Corridor were destroyed on the orders of Yitzhak Rabin due to the corridor's strategic location and route to Jerusalem and because of the residents' alleged aiding of Egyptian commandos in their attack on the city of Lod. The residents of the three villages were offered compensation but were not allowed to return.

Hebron/Bethlehem area
 Surit
 Beit Awwa
 Beit Mirsem
 Shuyoukh

Jordan Valley
 al-Jiftlik (depopulated but soon repopulated)
 Agarith
 Huseirat

Jerusalem area
 Nabi Samwil

In the Negev/Sinai Desert
 Auja al-Hafir – A demilitarized zone

Golan Heights

Over 100,000 Golan Heights residents were evacuated from about 25 villages whether on orders of the Syrian government or through fear of an attack by the Israeli Defense Forces and expulsion after the ceasefire. During the following months, more than a hundred Syrian villages were destroyed by Israel.

1979 Egypt–Israel Peace Treaty

Israeli settlements
Israeli settlements in the Sinai Peninsula were evacuated as a result of the 1979 Egypt–Israel peace treaty.
 Avshalom
 Dikla
 Netiv HaAsara, Sinai
 Ofira
 Pri'el
 Sufa
 Talmei Yosef
 Yamit

Israel's unilateral disengagement plan
As a part of Israel's unilateral disengagement plan, 21 civilian Israeli settlements were forcibly evacuated, as well as an area in the northern West Bank containing four Israeli villages. The residential buildings were razed by Israel but public structures were left intact. The religious structures not removed by Israel were later destroyed by Palestinians.

Israeli settlements

Other Villages
On 5 November 2020, Israeli bulldozers demolished most of the village of Khirbet Humsa al-Fawqa and forced 73 of its Palestinian residents, including 41 children to leave in what was the largest demolition in years. On 4 February 2021, Israel razed for the second time because of what it claimed was an illegal settlement next to a military firing range. On 7 July 2021, it was demolished by Israel again for at least the third time.

See also
 Killings and massacres during the 1948 Palestine War
 Transfer Committee
 1948 Palestinian exodus

References

Bibliography

External links
 UN map of the 1947 plan
 The Destroyed Villages on Google Earth - Arab only

 
Villages depopulated during the 1948 Arab-Israeli War
Arab–Israeli conflict
Lists of populated places
Villages depopulated during the 1948 Arab-Israeli War
Jewish exodus from Arab and Muslim countries